DZLC (98.5 FM), broadcasting as 98.5 Big Radio, is a radio station owned and operated by Vanguard Radio Network. The station's studio and transmitter are located at Lucky 8 Bldg., Brgy. San Sebastian, Lipa, Batangas.

The frequency was formerly owned by GV Broadcasting System (now Apollo Broadcast Investors) from 2003 to September 2010 under the brand Da Best 98.5.

References

Radio stations in Batangas
Radio stations established in 2003
Radio stations established in 2019